Kenneth Arthur Stroud (Richmond, Surrey, December, 1908 – Hertfordshire township, February 3, 2000) was a mathematician and Principal Lecturer in Mathematics at Lanchester Polytechnic in Coventry, England. He is most widely known as the author of several mathematics textbooks, especially the very popular Engineering Mathematics.

Education
Stroud held a B.Sc. and a DipEd.

Work
Stroud was an innovator in programmed learning and the identification of precise learning outcomes, and Nigel Steele calls his textbook Engineering Mathematics, based on the programmed learning approach, "one of the most successful mathematics textbooks ever published."

He died in February 2000, aged 91.

Bibliography
Laplace Transforms: Programmes and Problems, Stanley Thornes Ltd, 1973,  and 1978,  .
Fourier Series and Harmonic Analysis, Nelson Thornes Ltd, 1983,  and  Stanley Thornes Ltd, 1986, .
Engineering Mathematics, Macmillan, 1970, . 6th ed., (with Dexter J. Booth), Industrial Press, 2007, . 
Advanced Engineering Mathematics (with Dexter J. Booth), 5th ed., Industrial Press, 2011, 4th ed., Palgrave Macmillan, 2003, .
Differential Equations (with Dexter J. Booth), Industrial Press, 2004, .
Vector Analysis (with Dexter J. Booth), Industrial Press, 2005, .
Complex Variables (with Dexter J. Booth), Industrial Press, 2007, .
Linear Algebra (with Dexter J. Booth), Industrial Press, 2008, .
Essential Mathematics for Science and Technology: A Self-Learning Guide (with Dexter J. Booth), Industrial Press, 2009, .
Further Engineering Mathematics : Programmes and Problems, Palgrave Macmillan, 3 October 1986, . 2nd ed., Springer-Verlag, 1 November 1989, . 2nd ed., Palgrave Macmillan, June 1990, . 3rd Revised Edition, Palgrave Macmillan, 27 March 1996, .
Mathematics for engineering technicians, Stanley Thornes Ltd., 1978, . Book 2A : Practical applications'', Stanley Thornes Ltd., 1981, .

References

1908 births
2000 deaths
20th-century English mathematicians
People from Richmond, London